Anne Frances Lederman (born July 20, 1983) is an American comedian and podcast host. She has appeared on the MTV series Girl Code and hosted  the E! shows We Have Issues and Chelsea Lately, and @midnight. She is also known as the voice of Cheryl Fawkes in Grand Theft Auto V. Lederman's comedy has referred to her troubled past, including problems with alcoholism.

Early life and education
Lederman was born in Philadelphia to Abby and Scotty, shortly after midnight on July 20, 1983. Her fraternal twin brother was born minutes before her, on July 19. She is of English, German and Jewish ancestry. Lederman's father worked as a treasurer at the University of Pennsylvania, while her mother did social service work. Lederman was raised a Quaker and attended a Quaker school for her early education.

During her teenage years, Lederman trained to be a Junior Olympic swimmer, but gave up the sport after sustaining a foot injury in a car accident caused by a drunk driver. She subsequently studied at The Crefeld School and was sexually assaulted by a male teacher from the school. The incident led to a trial in which Lederman and another female student testified against him. She subsequently became involved with numerous troubled peers who dealt drugs and participated in other criminal activities. After graduating from high school at seventeen, Lederman spent the following year performing service work, first doing dolphin training in Hawaii before working in Central America for a nonprofit organization helping underprivileged children. She subsequently returned to the United States and worked as a camp counselor for Easterseals, as well as working at organizations helping children with disabilities such as cerebral palsy and spina bifida.

After spending a year doing service work, Lederman enrolled at The College of Santa Fe in Santa Fe, New Mexico, where she intermittently took classes for eight years, majoring in art and counseling. While attending college, Lederman developed a drinking problem, and suffered numerous blackout incidents, one of which included her crashing on a motor scooter and suffering serious injuries. "I wasn't getting wasted to have fun and be drunk," she recalled. "I wanted a fucking break. I hated myself. I just didn't want to be near myself." The college went out of business and closed two weeks after her graduation.

Career
In 2009, Lederman relocated to New York City to pursue a career in comedy, and became sober. Lederman created the YouTube channel Sausage Party Presents with video artist Abbey Luck in 2011. Between 2012 and 2014, she was a regular panelist on the E! series Chelsea Lately.

In 2013, Lederman provided the voice of Cheryl in the Rockstar video game Grand Theft Auto V. In 2015, she appeared on the short-lived comedy series We Have Issues.

In 2018, her comedy routine about dental floss has been widely repeated over the internet. The same year, she had a minor role in The Long Dumb Road. She enjoys making jokes on social media as well as stand-up, and believes it is easier to make one person laugh at a single joke than sustain a whole audience for an extended period.

Lederman started a podcast, Meanspiration, in 2019.

On February 16, 2021, Lederman, Khalyla Kuhn & Esther Povitsky launched  Trash Tuesday, which they describe on their YouTube channel page as: "It's a podcast. It's a show. It's comedy. It's drama. It's everything you want it to be and more."

On November 28, 2022, Lederman relaunched her Meanspiration podcast to  AnnieWood.

Filmography

Film

Television

Video games

Notes

References

Sources

External links 
 
 
 
 Sausage Party Presents

1983 births
Living people
American stand-up comedians
American Quakers
American women comedians
American people of English descent
Fraternal twins
Jewish American female comedians
People from Philadelphia
Santa Fe University of Art and Design alumni
21st-century American Jews
21st-century American women